James Thompson (23 September 1804, London – 2 December 1870, New York) was an American chess master.

Early life
Born in London, he arrived in New York, where formed the New York Chess Club in 1839.

Chess career
He participated in the First American Chess Congress at New York 1857, and lost a match to Paul Morphy (0 : 3) in the first round. He also lost other matches to him; casual (0 : 5) in 1857, two formal (3.5 : 5.5) in May/June 1859 and (6 : 10) in October 1859, and casual (1 : 3) in 1860 (Morphy gave odds of a knight in three latter matches). He drew a match with Charles D. Mead (1.5 : 1.5) in 1857, and played several times in New York Chess Club tournaments, losing to Frederick Perrin in 1854, 1857, and 1859, and James A. Leonard in 1860/61.

Death
Thompson died in 1870 in New York City.

References

External links
 Chessgames.com - James Thompson

1804 births
1870 deaths
English chess players
American chess players
19th-century chess players